The Continental Basketball Association was a men's professional basketball league that existed from 1946 to 2009. The league was formerly known as the Eastern Pennsylvania Basketball League, the Eastern Professional Basketball League and the Eastern Basketball Association. There were several annual awards in the CBA including the Player of the Year Award, the Rookie of the Year Award, the Coach of the Year Award, the Defensive Player of the Year Award and the Newcomer of the Year Award.

Regular season MVPs and Players of the Year

CBA Newcomer of the Year

CBA Rookie of the Year

CBA 50 Anniversary Team

EPBL/EBA era team (1946–1978)
Stacey Arceneaux — forward
Bill Chanecka — forward
Charlie Criss — guard
Tom Hemans — forward
Hal Lear — guard
Julius McCoy — forward
Stan Novak — coach
Roman Turmon — center
Ken Wilburn — center

CBA era team (1978–1996)
Vincent Askew — forward
Tico Brown — guard
Don Collins — forward
Ron Davis — forward
Claude Gregory — center
Glenn Hagan — guard
Charles Jones — center
Mauro Panaggio — coach
Derrick Rowland — forward
Robert Smith — guard
Clinton Wheeler — guard

CBA players who played at least 82 NBA games

Alaa Abdelnaby
Vincent Askew
Chucky Atkins
Anthony Avent
Greg Ballard
Ken Bannister
Kenny Battle
Corey Beck
Raja Bell
Mel Bennett
Walter Bond
Bruce Bowen
Earl Boykins
Charles Bradley
Dudley Bradley
Tim Breaux
Jim Brogan
Michael Brooks
Rick Brunson
Kevin Brooks
Tony Brown
Willie Burton
Steve Burtt Sr.
Mitchell Butler
Marty Byrnes
Adrian Caldwell
Rick Carlisle
Derrick Chievous
Chris Childs
Don Collins
Steve Colter
Darwin Cook
Hollis Copeland
Joe Courtney
Charlie Criss
Michael Curry
Lloyd Daniels
Emanual Davis
Todd Day
Greg Dreiling
Ledell Eackles
Mario Elie
LeRon Ellis
Jim Farmer
Jamie Feick
Eric Fernsten
Rod Foster
World B. Free
Tate George
Gerald Glass
Anthony Goldwire
Grant Gondrezick
Pétur Guðmundsson
Joe Graboski
Paul Graham
Ronnie Grandison
Greg Grant
Jeff Grayer
Litterial Green
Rickey Green
Adrian Griffin
Junior Harrington
Conner Henry
Steve Henson
Kenny Higgs
Craig Hodges
Tom Hoover
Stephen Howard
Eddie Hughes
Byron Irvin
Jaren Jackson
Henry James
Andy Johnson
Anthony Jones
Reggie Jordan
Larry Kenon
Randolph Keys
Bo Kimble
Albert King
Chris King
Gerard King
Greg Kite
Joe Kopicki
Rusty LaRue
Tim Legler
Voshon Lenard
Lewis Lloyd
John Long
Sidney Lowe
Oliver Mack
Sam Mack
Donny Marshall
Darrick Martin
Jeff Martin
Anthony Mason
Wes Matthews
Bob McCann
Andre McCarter
Amal McCaskill
Ben McDonald
Jeff McInnis
Kevin McKenna
Chris McNealy
Bob McNeill
Larry McNeill
Anthony Miller
Oliver Miller
Dirk Minniefield
Jamario Moon
Lowes Moore
Mikki Moore
Tracy Moore
Tod Murphy
Kenny Natt
Ed Nealy
Bob Netolicky
Chuck Nevitt
Ivano Newbill
Carl Nicks
Kurt Nimphius
Moochie Norris
Jawann Oldham
Brian Oliver
Kevin Ollie
Doug Overton
Gerald Paddio
Anthony Parker
Sam Pellom
Elliot Perry
Bobby Phills
Stan Pietkiewicz
Charles Pittman
Gary Plummer
Olden Polynice
Mark Pope
Kevin Pritchard
Mark Radford
Ed Rains
Mark Randall
Kelvin Ransey
Eldridge Recasner
Robert Reid
Jerry Reynolds
Micheal Ray Richardson
David Rivers
Anthony Roberts
Cliff Robinson
Larry Robinson
Rumeal Robinson
Lorenzo Romar
Scott Roth
Donald Royal
Clifford Rozier
Campy Russell
Cazzie Russell
Walker Russell
Mike Sanders
Steve Scheffler
Shawnelle Scott
Carey Scurry
Charles Shackleford
Reggie Slater
Charles Smith
Michael Smith
Robert Smith
Rory Sparrow
Larry Spriggs
Kevin Stacom
Bud Stallworth
Terence Stansbury
John Starks
Brook Steppe
Larry Stewart
Joe Strawder
Erick Strickland
Mark Strickland
Greg Sutton
Roy Tarpley
Terry Teagle
Carlos Terry
David Thirdkill
Jim Thomas
John Thomas
Bernard Thompson
Darren Tillis
Ray Tolbert
Sedric Toney
Raymond Townsend
Andre Turner
Elston Turner
Kelvin Upshaw
Ben Warley
Bryan Warrick
Pearl Washington
Trooper Washington
Slick Watts
Marvin Webster
Mark West
Ennis Whatley
Clinton Wheeler
Jo Jo White
Bill Bo White
Mitchell Wiggins
Eddie Lee Wilkins
Jeff Wilkins
Aaron Williams
Freeman Williams
Kevin Williams
Micheal Williams
Rob Williams
Sam Williams
John Williamson
Bill Willoughby
Othell Wilson
Al Wood
Leon Wood
Haywoode Workman
Danny Young

CBA coaches who coached at least 82 NBA games

CBA All-Star Game Most Valuable Player Award 

1961 – Alex "Boo" Ellis, Wilkes-Barre Barons
1963 – Bobby McNeill, Camden Bullets
1964 – Jimmie Hadnot, Trenton Colonials
1965 – Bobby McNeill, Camden Bullets
1966 – Walt Simon, Allentown Jets
1967 – Willie Murrell, Scranton Miners
1968 – Willis "Spider" Bennett, Hartford Capitols
1969 – Jim Jackson, Scranton Miners
1970 – John Savage, Wilmington Blue Bombers
1971 – Willie Somerset, Scranton Apollos
1972 – Reggie Lacefield, Hartford Capitols
1977 – Jim Bostic, Jersey Shore Bullets
1978 – Jim Bostic, Jersey Shore Bullets
1979 – Andre McCarter, Rochester Zeniths
1982 – Brad Branson, Anchorage Northern Knights
1983 – Larry Spriggs, Albany Patroons
1984 – Anthony Roberts, Wyoming Wildcatters
1985 – Rick Lamb, Wyoming Wildcatters
1986 – Don Collins, Tampa Bay Thrillers
1987 – Eddie Johnson, Tampa Bay Thrillers
1988 – Michael Brooks, Albany Patroons
1989 – Dwayne McClain, Rockford Lightning
1990 – Conner Henry, Rapid City Thrillers
1991 – Vincent Askew, Albany Patroons
1992 – Conner Henry, Yakima Sun Kings
1993 – Pat Durham, Fargo-Moorhead Fever
1994 – Jeff Martin, Grand Rapids Hoops
1995 – Tony Dawson, Rockford Lightning
1996 – Shelton Jones, Florida Beachdogs
1997 – Dexter Boney, Florida Beachdogs
2000 – Dontae' Jones, LaCrosse Bobcats
2003 – Versile Shaw, Sioux Falls Skyforce
2004 – Roberto Bergersen, Idaho Stampede
2005 – Sam Clancy, Jr., Idaho Stampede
2006 – Randy Holcomb, Gary Steelheads
2007 – Ralph Holmes, Yakama Sun Kings
2008 – Odell Bradley, Butte Daredevils

CBA draft first overall picks

References

External links
EPBL/EBA/CBA Superlatives

Award